The Rugby Football Union (RFU) is the national governing body for rugby union in England. It was founded in 1871, and was the sport's international governing body prior to the formation of what is now known as World Rugby (WR) in 1886. It promotes and runs the sport, organises international matches for the England national team, and educates and trains players and officials.

The RFU is an industrial and provident society owned by over 2,000 member clubs, representing over 2.5 million registered players, and forms the largest rugby union society in the world, and one of the largest sports organisations in England. It is based at Twickenham Stadium, London.

In September 2010 the equivalent women's rugby body, the Rugby Football Union for Women (RFUW), was able to nominate a member to the RFU Council to represent women and girls rugby. The RFUW  was integrated into the RFU in July 2012.

Early history (19th century)

Formation

On 4 December 1870, Edwin Ash of Richmond and Benjamin Burns of Blackheath published a letter in The Times suggesting that "those who play the rugby-type game should meet to form a code of practice as various clubs play to rules which differ from others, which makes the game difficult to play". On 26 January 1871 a meeting attended by representatives from 21 clubs was held in London at the Pall Mall Restaurant on Regent Street.

The 21 clubs present at the meeting were: Blackheath (represented by Burns and Frederick Stokes, the latter becoming the first captain of England), Richmond, Ravenscourt Park, West Kent, Marlborough Nomads, Wimbledon Hornets, Gipsies, Civil Service, The Law Club, Wellington College, Guy's Hospital, Flamingoes, Clapham Rovers, Harlequin F.C., King's College Hospital, St Paul's, Queen's House, Lausanne, Addison, Mohicans, and Belsize Park. The one notable omission was the Wasps. According to one version, a Wasps' representative was sent to attend the meeting, but owing to a misunderstanding was sent to the wrong venue at the wrong time on the wrong day; another version is that he went to a venue of the same name where, after consuming a number of drinks, he realised his mistake but was too drunk to make his way to the correct venue. Ealing Rugby Club (now Ealing Trailfinders) also received an invitation, but their representative stopped in a public house and also missed the meeting.

As a result of this meeting the Rugby Football Union (RFU) was founded. Algernon Rutter was elected as the first president of the RFU, and Edwin Ash was elected as treasurer. Three lawyers who were Rugby School alumni (Rutter, Holmes and L.J. Maton) drew up the first laws of the game, which were approved in June 1871.

Although similar unions were organised during the next few years in Ireland, Wales, Scotland, New Zealand, Australia, France, Canada, South Africa, and the United States, the RFU was the first and therefore had no need to distinguish itself from others by calling itself the English RFU.

Northern clubs secede – Rugby League
Twenty-two rugby clubs from across the north of England met on 29 August 1895 in the George Hotel in Huddersfield, where they voted to secede from the Rugby Football Union. The main reason for the split was the wish of players to be compensated for lost wages when playing Rugby. Many working class players in the North lost wages to play. The R.F.U. opposed players being paid. They set up the Northern Rugby Football Union (later renamed the Rugby Football League). The RFU took strong action against the clubs involved in the formation of the NRFU, all of whom were deemed to have forfeited their amateur status and therefore to have left the RFU. A similar interpretation was applied to all players who played either for or against such clubs, whether or not they received any compensation. These players were barred indefinitely from any involvement in organised rugby union. These comprehensive and enduring sanctions, combined with the very localised nature of most rugby competition, meant that most northern clubs had little practical option but to affiliate with the NRFU in the first few years of its existence.

The modern era (1970 – present)

The RFU long resisted competitions and leagues fearing that they would encourage foul play and professionalism. The first club competition, then known as the R.F.U. Club Competition, took place in 1972. Following a sponsorship agreement it became known as the John Player Cup in 1976.

The RFU agreed to the formation of a league pyramid in 1987.

Prince Harry, Duke of Sussex served as patron until February 2021.

Women
In 2005 the RFU began talks about a merger with the governing body for women's rugby union the RFUW. In September 2010 the RFUW was able to nominate a member to the RFU Council to represent women and girls rugby. The RFUW  was integrated into the RFU in July 2012.

In July 2022, a vote of the RFU Council approved by a narrow margin to prohibit transgender women from playing in the female category, and to require a risk assessment for transgender men. The Liverpool Tritons, in coordination with International Gay Rugby, have condemned the decision and protested at Pride in Liverpool. 

In September 2022, transgender player Julie Curtiss began a legal challenge to the ban on transgender women in female rugby by sending the RFU a pre-action protocol letter.

Structure

In response to the faltering results of the England national team, Rob Andrew was appointed on 18 August 2006 by the RFU to the post of Director of Elite Rugby, to oversee all aspects of representative rugby in England from the regional academies to the full senior side, including senior team selection powers and the power to hire and fire coaches at all levels of English rugby. Andrew also had the task of building bridges with the premiership clubs and the RFU in terms of players withdrawal from their club duties for international duties. On 6 January 2011 his role of Director of Elite Rugby was scrapped in an overhaul of the organisation's structure.

Chief executive John Steele opted to create a single rugby department divided into the areas of performance, operations and development with the emphasis on "delivering rugby at all levels", with each area having its own director.

National teams

Men's team

The England national rugby union team competes in the annual Six Nations Championship with France, Ireland, Scotland, Italy, and Wales. They have won this championship outright on a total of 28 occasions (with the addition of 10 shared victories), 13 times winning the Grand Slam and 25 times winning the Triple Crown, making them the most successful team in the tournament's history. England are to date the only team from the northern hemisphere to win the Rugby World Cup, when they won the tournament back in 2003. They were also runners-up in 1991, 2007 and 2019. They are currently ranked third in the world by World Rugby as of 8 March 2020.

Women's national team

The England women's national rugby union team first played in 1982. England have taken part in every Women's Rugby World Cup competition. They won the competition in 1994 by defeating the United States 38–23 in the final, and again in 2014 by beating Canada 21–9 in the final. They finished as runner-up on four other occasions.  Their coach is Simon Middleton after their coach Gary Street, who had been head coach since 2006, retired in 2015.

Men's national sevens team

The England national rugby sevens team competes in the World Rugby Sevens Series, Rugby World Cup Sevens and the Commonwealth Games. England's best finish in the Sevens Series is second place, which they have achieved four times, most recently in the 2016-17 season.
The England Sevens team has generated several notable sevens players. Ben Gollings holds the record for points scored on the Sevens Series with 2,652 points. Dan Norton holds the record for tries scored on the Sevens Series with 338 tries as of October 2019. England's Simon Amor (2004) and Ollie Phillips (2009) have each won a World Rugby Sevens Player of the Year award.

World Championship winning teams (7)
England men's senior team
2003

England women's senior team
1994, 2014

England men's under-20
2013, 2014, 2016

England men's sevens
1993

Domestic high-level competitions

Premiership
Premiership Rugby is an English professional rugby union competition. The Premiership consists of twelve clubs, and is the top division of the English rugby union system. Premiership clubs qualify for Europe's two main club competitions, the European Rugby Champions Cup and the European Rugby Challenge Cup. The team finishing at the bottom of the Premiership each season was relegated to the second-division RFU Championship until 2020, and the winner of the Championship is promoted to the Premiership until 2022. The competition has been played since 1987, and has evolved into the current Premiership system. The current champions are Leicester Tigers. The most recently promoted side are Saracens.

Championship
The RFU Championship is the second tier of the English rugby union league system and was founded in September 1987. The league was previously known as National Division One and in 2009 changed from a league consisting of semi-professional clubs to one that was fully professional. However since 2020 several clubs have since returned to a semi-professional model. The current champions are Saracens who won promotion to the English Premiership after beating the Ealing Trailfinders in a two-legged play-off, having finished second in the league during the league season.

Premier 15s
The Premier 15s is the top tier of the women's English rugby union domestic league system run by the Rugby Football Union. The league was created mainly from teams in the Women's Premiership. Its first season began on 16 September 2017. The current champions are Saracens, with the runners up being Harlequins.

Royal Patrons
Royal Patrons of the Rugby Football Union:

 Queen Elizabeth II  1952December 2016
 Prince Harry, Duke of Sussex December 2016February 2021
Catherine, Princess of Wales  February 2022Present

Arms

See also
Army Rugby Union
County Championship
Rugby union in England

References

 Collins, Tony (2009); A Social History of English Rugby Union, Routledge. .

External links
 
 Official RFU Clubs Website
 Army Rugby Union

1871 establishments in England
Organisations based in the London Borough of Richmond upon Thames
 
Rugby union governing bodies in Europe
Sports governing bodies in England
England
Sports organizations established in 1871